Janaki Medical College and Teaching Hospital is a medical school located in Ramdaiya-Bhawadi, Chireshwarnath municipality of Dhanusha district. The college operates two hospitals: a smaller 150 bedded hospital at Ramdaiya and a bigger 350+ bedded hospital at Bramhapuri, Janakpur, Nepal. It provides healthcare education in association with Tribhuvan University Institute of Medicine and regulated by Nepal Medical Council. It is managed by Ram Janaki Health Foundation which is registered under the Nepalese company act. The college with established in 2003 with an annual intake of 80 students a year to a Bachelor of Medicine and Bachelor of Surgery program. In addition to its Bachelor of Medicine and Bachelor of Surgery program, the college also offers nursing courses at an affordable fee structure. In 2020, Janaki Medical College was awarded with Post Graduate program in department of Surgery and department of Emergency Medicine.

Programs 
The college offers following programs:
 Bachelor of Medicine and Bachelor of Surgery (MBBS)
 Post Graduate - MD/MS
 Bachelor of Nursing

Hospital services 
There are two hospitals. Both offer following services:
 Outpatient department
 Inpatient department
 Emergency
 Occupational therapy services
 Coronary care
 Intensive care
 Neonatal intensive care
 Laboratory
 X-rays
 Ultrasonography
 CT scans
 Magnetic resonance imaging

References 

Medical colleges in Nepal